A cake and pie server, also called a cake shovel, pie knife, crépe spade, pie-getter, pie lifter, pie spatula, cake knife, or cake slice is a serving utensil used in the cutting and serving of pies and cakes. Some cake and pie servers have serrated edges. Another use for the utensil can be to serve pizza.

See also
List of serving utensils
List of food preparation utensils

Serving utensils